Alsószentiván is a village in Fejér county in Hungary. One of its main streets is called Ady Endre utca, named after the famous Hungarian writer Ady Endre.

References

External links 
 Street map 

Populated places in Fejér County